Konstantinos Karydas (born 12 August 1942) is a Greek alpine skier. He competed in three events at the 1964 Winter Olympics.

References

1942 births
Living people
Greek male alpine skiers
Olympic alpine skiers of Greece
Alpine skiers at the 1964 Winter Olympics
Place of birth missing (living people)